Dennisville is an unincorporated community located within Dennis Township, in Cape May County, in the U.S. state of New Jersey. It is part of the Ocean City Metropolitan Statistical Area. Its postal ZIP Code is 08214.

Dennisville is on the south side of Dennis Creek and is the most important community within Dennis Township. The main transportation artery is New Jersey Route 47 (Delsea Drive).

Demographics

History
Dennisville was founded in 1726 by Anthony Ludlam. The first post office in the area was Dennis Creek, established September 7, 1802, with Jeremiah Johnson as first postmaster. The name was changed to Dennisville in 1854.

In the 1880s, a local industry sprung up—described by The New York Times as "the like of which does not exist anywhere else in the world"—in which cedar trees that had fallen as much as decades earlier were recovered from under the surface of local swamps.

Emergency services

Fire

Education
As with other parts of Dennis Township, the area is zoned to Dennis Township Public Schools (for grades K-8) and Middle Township Public Schools (for high school). The latter operates Middle Township High School.

Countywide schools include Cape May County Technical High School and Cape May County Special Services School District.

Notable people

People who were born in, residents of, or otherwise closely associated with Dennisville include:
 Jonathan Maslow (1948-2008), author who wrote extensively about nature, with a focus on obscure and little understood animals.
 Jarrett Porter (born 1993), baritone known for his performances as an opera and lieder singer.

References

External links

 The Cape May County Gazette Local community newspaper

1726 establishments in New Jersey
Dennis Township, New Jersey
Populated places established in 1726
Unincorporated communities in Cape May County, New Jersey
Unincorporated communities in New Jersey